Everard Green, FSA (1844 – 1926) was an English officer of arms at the College of Arms in London. He began his heraldic career in 1893 with his appointment as Rouge Dragon Pursuivant of Arms in Ordinary. He continued in this post until 9 October 1911 when he was appointed Somerset Herald of Arms in Ordinary.  He continued in this office until his death on 22 June 1926.

Green was born in 1844, the son of Charles and Mary Green, at Holdich House, Spalding.

See also
 Heraldry
 Pursuivant
 Herald

References

 The College of Arms
 CUHAGS Officer of Arms Index

1844 births
1926 deaths
English genealogists
English officers of arms
People educated at St Edmund's College, Ware